is a 1994 puzzle video game developed and published by Hudson Soft for the PC Engine (in Super CD-ROM² format) on December 22, 1994. It was later released for the Neo Geo, Super Famicom, Sharp X68000, FM Towns, NEC PC-9821, Virtual Boy, and PlayStation Portable. It saw a re-release for the Wii and Wii U's Virtual Console services. Panic Bomber is a falling block game with the players' goal being to clear matching blocks using bombs, ensuring that their screen does not fill and that their opponents' screens do. It received mixed to positive reception, identified as a decent game by multiple critics. It has been compared to the falling block puzzle game Tetris. The Virtual Boy version was received mixed reception for its handling of the platform's visual capabilities.

Gameplay

It is a "falling blocks" puzzle game based on the Bomberman franchise. The goal of the game is essentially to cause your opponent to lose by causing their gameplay field to fill to the top with objects. You do this by causing chains of bombs to explode, sending useless rubble over to your opponent's field, which they must then remove themselves. Bombs are earned by causing chains of three identical blocks to disappear. Bombs can only be blown up with an explosion from a lit bomb, which falls from the top of the screen every so often. If the player causes enough damage, they can eventually earn a giant bomb, which will remove a large amount of debris from the playing field, and cause their opponent a good deal of trouble.

The game's regular story mode revolves around Bomberman's hunt for the Golden Bomber statue. During his trek, he fights against several different odd characters, like Drifty the balloon, or Cecil the tiger. However, all that can really be earned from playing through this mode is a harder difficulty level, earned by finishing the entire story at the "hard" difficulty level. The player's progress is saved by a password system.

Ports and related releases

Panic Bomber was ported to: 
 Neo Geo
 Super Famicom (Released as  stylistically as )
 Multiple Japanese home computers such as Sharp X68000, FM Towns and NEC PC-9821
 Virtual Boy (Released simply as )
 PlayStation Portable
The Virtual Boy version uses a red-and-black color scheme and parallax, an optical trick that is used to simulate a 3D effect. A mini-game similar to Panic Bomber was also included in Bomberman Land 2. The original PC-Engine CD version of Panic Bomber was later re-released on Wii in 2008 and the Wii U Virtual Console in Japan in 2015 (with the latter release also being available for the first time for North America and Europe in 2017, albeit untranslated). A port for the Neo Geo CD was also showcased but never released.

Reception

The Neo Geo version of Panic Bomber was a moderate success in Japan.

On release, Famicom Tsūshin scored the Super Famicom version of the game a 22 out of 40, giving the Virtual Boy version a 20 out of 40. The four reviewers of Electronic Gaming Monthly gave the Neo Geo version a 7 out of 10, describing it as a decent if unexceptional Tetris clone, with one reviewer commenting that "This genre is so flooded that it's hard to come up with a unique angle, and there isn't one for Panic Bomber", while the other three argued that the game "has enough originality to make it stand on its own." GamePro remarked that the gameplay and graphics are too simple to justify the game's appearance on the powerful Neo Geo, but praised its play mechanics and addictive nature and concluded, "For a system renowned for fighting games, Panic is a refreshing presence."

Reviewing the Virtual Boy version, a Next Generation critic said that while the game itself is "decent" and "addictive", it is poorly suited for the Virtual Boy, since it does not use the console's 3D capabilities and is less fun to play without colors to distinguish the different pieces. He gave it two out of five stars. GamePro, in contrast, said the game "pushes the Virtual Boy engine to its max", while admitting the 3D effects are "a little timid". The reviewer hailed the gameplay as being "as addictive as Zoop or Tetris."

See also
Puyo Puyo
Panel de Pon
Magical Drop

Notes

References

External links

1994 video games
Panic Bomber
Cancelled Neo Geo CD games
FM Towns games
NEC PC-9801 games
Neo Geo games
Puzzle video games
Super Nintendo Entertainment System games
TurboGrafx-CD games
PlayStation Portable games
Video games developed in Japan
Virtual Boy games
Virtual Console games
Virtual Console games for Wii U
Hudson Soft games
ASCII Media Works games
X68000 games
Multiplayer and single-player video games
Eighting games

ja:とびだせ!ぱにボン
ja:スーパーボンバーマン ぱにっくボンバーW